The 2012–13 EHF Champions League was the 53rd edition of Europe's premier club handball tournament and the 20th edition under the current EHF Champions League format. THW Kiel was the defending champion. The final four was played on 1–2 June 2013.

HSV Hamburg won their first title by defeating FC Barcelona 30–29 in the final.

Overview

Team allocation

Notes
th Title Holder
Note 2: AG København was seeded in pot 1 for the 2012–13 EHF Champions League group stage draw, which took place in Vienna, Austria, on 6 July 2012. However, the club filed for bankruptcy on 31 July 2012 and their place in the group stage was awarded to Bjerringbro-Silkeborg.
Note 3: RK Cimos Koper was invited to the Wild card tournament to replace Bjerringbro-Silkeborg, who replaced AG København in the group stage.

Round and draw dates
All draws held at EHF headquarters in Vienna, Austria unless stated otherwise.

Qualification stage

Qualification tournament
A total of 14 teams will take part in the qualification tournaments. The clubs will be drawn into three groups of four and play a semifinal and the final. The winner of the qualification groups advance to the group stage, while the eliminated clubs will go to the EHF Cup. Matches will be played at 8–9 September 2011. The draw will take place on 3 July, at 11:00 local time at Vienna, Austria.

Seedings
The two remaining teams from Pot 1 and 4 will play a knock-out match, the winner will go into the group stage. The draw was held on 3 July 2012.

Qualification tournament 1
RK Partizan organized the event.

Qualification tournament 2
Haslum HK organized the event.

Qualification tournament 3
HCM Constanța organized the event.

Play-off

Wild card tournament

Group stage

The draw for the group stage took place at the Gartenhotel Altmannsdorf in Vienna on 6 July 2012 at 11:00 local time. A total of 24 teams were drawn into four groups of six. Teams were divided into six pots, based on EHF coefficients. Clubs from the same pot or the same association could not be drawn into the same group, except the wild card tournament winner, which did not enjoy any protection.

Seedings

th Title holder. The title holder automatically gets the top position of seeding list.

Notes
Note 1: AG København was seeded in pot 1 for the 2012–13 EHF Champions League group stage draw, which took place in Vienna, Austria, on 6 July 2012. However, the club filed for bankruptcy on 31 July 2012 and their place in the group stage was awarded to Bjerringbro-Silkeborg.

Group A

Group B

Group C

Group D

Knockout stage

In the knockout phase, teams played against each other over two legs on a home-and-away basis, except for the final four.

Last 16
The draw was held on 26 February 2013 at 12:30 in Vienna, Austria. The first legs were played on 13–17 March, and the second legs were played on 20–24 March 2013.

|}

Quarterfinals
The first legs were played on 17–21 April, and the second legs were played on 24–28 April 2013.

|}

Final four
The draw was held on 2 May 2013.

Top goalscorers

(excluding qualifying rounds)

Awards

The All-star team of the Champions League 2012/13:

See also
2012–13 EHF Cup

References

External links
Official website

 
Champions League
Champions League
EHF Champions League seasons